The 2006–07 season saw Dundee compete in the Scottish First Division after coming 7th place the season prior. Dundee finished in 3rd position with 53 points.

Final league table

Results 
Dundee's score comes first

Legend

Scottish First Division

Scottish Cup

Scottish League Cup

Scottish Challenge Cup

References

External links 

 Dundee 2006–07 at Soccerbase.com (select relevant season from dropdown list)

Dundee F.C. seasons
Dundee